Umesh Shrestha is a Nepalese politician, and business person, currently serving in the Office of the Prime Minister and Council of Ministers in Nepal. He served as the State Minister for Health and Population in Nepal.

He has significantly contributed to the economic development of the Agriculture, Tourism, Hydropower, Banking, and Industrial sectors of Nepal.

Early life 
Umesh Shrestha was born on 3 February 1956 in Bhojpur Bazzar 4, Bhojpur.

Shrestha is currently residing in Lalitpur Lalitpur Metropolitan City 03, Jhamsikhel.

Education 
Shrestha completed his Secondary Leaving Certificate (SLC) from Bhojpur. To pursue higher education, he ventured into Kathmandu and completed his MA and B.Ed.

Shrestha has observed the Education system and pedagogy of over 3 dozen countries, namely, the United States of America, Britain, Canada, France, Germany, Sweden, Italy, Portugal, South Africa, Australia, Russia, China, India, Japan, Malaysia, Denmark, Norway, Qatar, Vietnam and Cambodia.

Career 
Shrestha has dedicatedly worked in the Education sector for over 42 years.

He has worked as the Senior Chairperson of the Private and Boarding Schools' Organisation Nepal (PABSON) for 2 tenures and as the Chairperson for 2 terms. The Co-Founder of Little Angel’s Education Group, Shrestha is also the Chief Advisor of Higher Institutions and Secondary Schools' Association Nepal (HISSAN).

He is also the Chairperson of the Nepal Education Foundation located in Kathmandu. He is the Founding Chairperson of Small Heaven School in Chitwan. He is the Co-Founder of Little Angels’ School, Little Angels’ College of Management, and Ideal Model School. He is the Founding Chairperson of Millennium Publication Pvt. ltd, Hattiban, Lalitpur.

Shrestha has been the Chairperson of Agriculture related companies such as Himalayan Flora Lalitpur, Sagarmatha Tea Estate Sankhuwasabha, Dadabokhim Namuna Krishi Tatha Paramarsh Kendra Bhojpur, Jiri Akikrit Namuna Krishi Tatha Paramarsha Kendra Dolakah and Orchid Farm Lalitpur.

Shrestha is also involved in Hydropower Projects. He is the Chairperson of PhanchThar Power and Kalanga Basin Hydro Project. He is also engaged in Mountain Energy and Vision Energy Ramechhap Hydropower projects.

He is the Founder of Siraichuli hotel, Bharatpur. He has also invested in Central Park Resort Sauraha, and Himalayan Drishya Resort Dhulikhel.

Shrestha is also involved in the Health Sector of Nepal and worked as the State Minister for the Health and Population Department of Nepal. During the COVID-19 Pandemic in Nepal, he significantly helped and contributed to the relief work for the public.

References

Nepal MPs 2017–2022
Living people
Nepali Congress politicians from Bagmati Province
Members of the 2nd Nepalese Constituent Assembly
People from Chitwan District
1956 births